Likely Airport may refer to:

 Likely Aerodrome, serving Likely, British Columbia, Canada
 Likely Airport (California), a private airport in Likely, California, United States (FAA: 9CL3)

id:Bandar Udara Likely